Metallothionein-1E is a protein that in humans is encoded by the MT1E gene.

References

Further reading